Sejřek is a municipality and village in Žďár nad Sázavou District in the Vysočina Region of the Czech Republic. It has about 200 inhabitants.

Administrative parts
The village of Bor is an administrative part of Sejřek.

References

Villages in Žďár nad Sázavou District